Here Come the Brides is an American comedy Western series from Screen Gems that aired on the ABC television network from September 25, 1968 to April 3, 1970. It was loosely based on Asa Mercer's efforts in the 1860s to import marriageable women (the Mercer Girls) from the East Coast cities of the United States to Seattle, where there was a shortage.

Backstory
The producers said the show was inspired by the movie Seven Brides for Seven Brothers in an interview with LA Times TV critic Cecil Smith.

As a television western, set shortly after the end of the Civil War, the series rarely featured any form of gunplay, and violence was generally limited to comical fistfights. This was in keeping with the restrictions on television violence at the time. Stories highlighted the importance of cooperation, inter-racial harmony, and peaceful resolution of conflict. Plots were usually a mix of drama and humor. Being one of the first shows targeted at young women, most of the humor was at the expense of the men, but not particularly bitingly so.

The 1951 movie Westward the Women follows a similar theme.

Plot summary

In the pilot episode, smooth-talking, charismatic logging company boss Jason Bolt (Robert Brown) is faced with a shutdown of his operation as lonely lumberjacks are ready to leave Seattle due to the lack of female companionship.  He promises to find marriageable ladies willing to come to the frontier town (population 152) and stay for a full year. Sawmill owner Aaron Stempel (Mark Lenard) puts up much of the expense money as a wager that Bolt will not succeed in bringing 100 suitable women; the Bolt brothers bet their mountain, Bridal Veil Mountain, home to their logging company.

The Bolts travel to New Bedford, Massachusetts, recruit the women, then charter a mule-ship to take them back to Seattle. Local saloon owner Lottie (Joan Blondell) takes the women under her wing and becomes a mother figure to them, while Bolt desperately works to keep the women from leaving at the next high tide.

Eventually, the women decide to give Seattle and the loggers a chance.  The ship's captain, Clancy (Henry Beckman), develops a relationship with Lottie and becomes a regular character in the series.

Much of the dramatic and comedic tension in the first season revolved around Stempel's efforts to sabotage the deal so he can take over the Bolts' holdings. Stempel became more friendly in the second and final season, which focused more on the development of individual characters and the conflicts associated with newcomers and with people just passing through. One running theme is the importance of family, as the Bolt brothers show through the closeness of their relationships, that by sticking together, democratically taking family votes, they can overcome the surprising obstacles life presents.

Bobby Sherman and David Soul were propelled to pop stardom as Jason's brothers, Jeremy and Joshua.  Jeremy took a prominent role, not only as the boyfriend of Candy Pruitt (Bridget Hanley), the beautiful, unofficial leader of the brides, but also as a young man with a stammer.  In one episode, he is temporarily able to manage his stammer following coaching by a traveler who has come to Seattle.  Upon discovering that his benefactor is actually a con artist, his faith is shaken so deeply that the stammer returns.

The show addressed many social issues — racism, ethnic discrimination, treatment of the handicapped and mentally impaired, business ethics, and ecology.

Cast

Main characters
First season
Opening credits sequence:
Jason Bolt (Robert Brown)
Jeremy Bolt (Bobby Sherman)
Joshua Bolt (David Soul)
Aaron Stempel (Mark Lenard)
Candace "Candy" Pruitt (Bridget Hanley)
Lottie Hatfield (Joan Blondell)

Ending credits:
Captain Clancey (Henry Beckman)
Biddie Cloom (Susan Tolsky)

With the death of Susan Tolsky in October 2022, the only main cast members surviving are Bobby Sherman and David Soul.

Recurring characters
Ben Perkins (Hoke Howell)
Corky (Robert Biheller)
Olaf "Big Swede" Gustavsen (Bo Svenson)
Essie Halliday (Mitzi Hoag), school teacher and eventually Big Swede's wife
Franny (Carole Shelyne)
Ann (Cynthia Hull)

Second season
Opening credits:

Those listed for the first season, plus
Captain Clancey (Henry Beckman)
Biddie Cloom (Susan Tolsky)

End credits:
Ben Perkins (Hoke Howell)
Corky (Robert Biheller)
Christopher Pruitt (Eric Chase, 1969–1970), Candy Pruitt's younger brother
Molly Pruitt (Patti Cohoon, 1969–1970), Candy's younger sister

Notable guest stars

A young Bruce Lee appeared as a Chinese immigrant named Lin in the episode "Marriage Chinese Style" (1969). This character was the only dramatic English language non-martial arts role in Lee's acting career. Character actress Nora Marlowe played Mrs. Bronson in the same episode.

Cicely Tyson, Jane Wyatt, Edward Asner, Majel Barrett (Star Trek), Barry Williams (pre-The Brady Bunch), Marge Redmond and Madeleine Sherwood (both known as regulars in The Flying Nun), Bernard Fox (Dr. Bombay of Bewitched), Vic Tayback (an extra as one of 'Jason's men' in the premiere episode, later a guest star), Lynda Day George, Bob Cummings (star of The Bob Cummings Show 1955–1959 on NBC and The New Bob Cummings Show 1961–1962 on CBS), Daniel J. Travanti and James B. Sikking (both later known for Hill Street Blues), Larry Linville (M*A*S*H) and Billy Mumy (Lost in Space) all made guest appearances.

Mitzi Hoag, who played Miss Essie during the season 1, had two guest roles in season 2 as completely different characters, one as a Greek immigrant in the episode "Land Grant" and another as a nun in the episode "Absalom".

Episodes

Season 1 (1968–69)

Season 2 (1969–70)

Reception
First season ratings were impressive enough to ensure its renewal for a second season, though only 152 ABC affiliates agreed to broadcast the series, compared to another Screen Gems' series, Bewitched, which was broadcast on 217 ABC affiliates in the same 1968/69 season, prompting ABC affiliated radio and television stations to add a voice-over in all related HCTB promotional commercials inviting viewers to watch " ...Here Come the Brides!, Wednesdays at 7:30, 6:30 central, over MOST of these ABC stations!"   For the second season, the family-geared series was moved from the 7:30 Wednesday night "Family Hour" to the more adult-oriented time slot of 9:00 Friday night in September 1969. This move to the Friday night death slot combined with the low ABC affiliate support caused the ratings to quickly slide out of the top 40, and production ceased in the spring of 1970, although most of those ABC affiliates repeated episodes throughout the summer months, as was then a standard procedure with most series. The final primetime episode in the United States was broadcast on Friday September 18, 1970.
 
Joan Blondell received Emmy Award nominations each season for her performance as Lottie Hatfield. She lost to Barbara Bain in 1969, and to Susan Hampshire in 1970.

Music
The theme song "Seattle" was written by Jack Keller and Ernie Sheldon. Both Perry Como and Bobby Sherman recorded slightly different variations of the song. Como scored a minor hit, with his version reaching No. 38 in the U.S. Sherman's version, although receiving some airplay, was never released as a single. There is no reference in either version regarding the TV series title, i.e.; "...look out everyone! Here Come the Brides!" Starting with the series debut in September 1968 the series opened with a rousing instrumental score featuring screen stills of "Jason", "Jeremy & Joshua", "Candy & Aaron" and "Lottie". Starting with episode 8 ("A Jew Named Sullivan") as evidenced by the end credits, and to coincide with the spring 1969 release of the Perry Como 'pop' recording, the TV theme was reworked by overdubbing vocals/lyrics to the same theme music already recorded (as used previously) along with updating all the opening character stills, including the addition of a "Clancy & Biddie" screen. The added lyrics performed by "The New Establishment" and updated screen stills were featured for the remainder of the first season and remained unchanged for the entire second season.  In the beginning syndication years, the instrumental version of the opening credits was placed on all episodes.  In recent years, the vocal theme of the opening credits has been restored to the second-season episodes (although with the first season screen stills).

French version
A French-language version of the show and theme song (performed by a chorus of male singers) was a smash hit in French Canada, under the title Cent filles à marier (A Hundred Girls to Marry Off). The show capitalized on the popularity of the American version and the fact that a similar "bride drive" (see Filles du roi) is also part of Québec's cultural mythos.

Home media and books
Sony Pictures Home Entertainment released the first season on DVD in Region 1 on May 16, 2006.

On October 14, 2011, Shout! Factory announced that it had acquired the home-media rights to the series, and it later released the final season on DVD. It was subsequently released on February 28, 2012. However, the season 1 opening cast-and-credit sequence was used for this release, using the New Establishment's vocals, but ignoring Henry Beckman's and Susan Tolsky's respective credits.

In December 2009, BearManor Media released a nostalgic look into the program's history, Gangway, Lord: (The) Here Come The Brides Book by Jonathan Etter, which featured a foreword by Robert Brown. Bobby Sherman was the only (then) surviving cast member who did not cooperate with the author. However, Sherman did discuss the series in his autobiography, Bobby Sherman: Still Remembering You, whose contents he dictated to Dena Hill, and was subsequently published by Contemporary Books in 1996.

Syndication
Reruns were aired on CBN Cable during the mid-1980s.

Early in January 2011, digital sub-network Antenna TV began airing the series.

INSP began broadcasting a back to back 2 episode block of the series on Sunday mornings in 2018 continuing through 2020.

The Decades channel aired most of the series during a weekend marathon on June 2–3, 2018; February 1–2, 2019 and again January 23–24, 2021 in widescreen format. The episodes were cropped for the widescreen presentation.

In autumn 2021 the series began airing on MeTV+.

In January 2022 GetTV began airing episodes in a 75 minute format on Saturday & Sunday at 11:15 am Eastern.

Star Trek crossovers 
Barbara Hambly's Star Trek novel Ishmael has Spock traveling back to the time and place of Here Come the Brides after discovering a Klingon plot to destroy the Federation by killing Aaron Stempel (spelled "Stemple" in the book) before he could thwart an attempted 19th-century alien invasion of Earth. During most of the story, Spock has lost his memory and is cared for by Stempel, who passes him off as his nephew "Ishmael" and helps him hide his alien origins.

At the end of the story, Captain Kirk discovers that Stempel is one of Spock's mother's ancestors, a reference to the fact that Mark Lenard also played Spock's father Sarek in episodes of the original Star Trek and Star Trek: The Next Generation, as well as several of the Star Trek motion pictures. Also the same actor played descendants of Mr. Spock on his father's and his mother's sides of the family.

Majel Barrett, who played Nurse Christine Chapel in Star Trek, appeared as Tessa a dancehall woman in the first-season episode "Lovers and Wanderers".

Jane Wyatt who played Spock's mother in the original series, made a guest appearance in the final episode of the series, "Two Women".  She did not have any scenes with Mark Lenard.

In addition to Lenard, other Brides actors appeared in Star Trek: Robert Brown (both of the Lazaruses in "The Alternative Factor"), David Soul (Makora in "The Apple"), and semi-regular Carole Shelyne (the visible representation of a Metron in "Arena", whose voice Vic Perrin provided in that installment).

References

External links 
 
 
 Here Come the Brides Fan Club Website
 Behind-the-scenes production photos Collection of crew member Stephen Lodge (set costumer).

1968 American television series debuts
1970 American television series endings
1960s American sitcoms
1970s American sitcoms
American Broadcasting Company original programming
Culture of Seattle
English-language television shows
Television series by Sony Pictures Television
Television shows set in Seattle
1960s Western (genre) television series
Television series by Screen Gems
1970s Western (genre) television series